The Diana Chronicles is a 2007 British biographical book by Tina Brown that chronicles the life and death of Diana, Princess of Wales. The book's release coincided with the increased attention Diana had received leading up to the tenth anniversary of her death in 1997. Brown writes in a preface: The biography was based on over 250 interviews with men and women – members of Diana's intimate circle, associates in her public life and partners in her philanthropy.

Content
Of the conspiracy theories surrounding the death of Diana in 1997, Brown surveys the evidence extensively and concludes "In any sequence of events of such complexity, speed, and drama, there are bound to be confusions and discrepancies. But the evidence is overwhelming that this was a traffic accident – period."

More than 250 witnesses came forward in the British Coroner's Inquests into the deaths of Diana and Dodi Fayed in 2007. After reporting and analyzing the evidence, the paperback edition of The Diana Chronicles carries an Afterword in which the author concludes: "The [inquests] were not so much an inquiry as an exorcism of every lie and myth surrounding the way the Princess died."

Sales
The Diana Chronicles was at number one on The New York Times Best Seller list for hardback nonfiction for the week of 8 to 15 July 2007.

Reception
According to Christopher Hitchens author of God Is Not Great:

According to Simon Schama author of A History of Britain:

According to Tom Wolfe:

According to Helen Mirren, Academy Award-winning actress:

According to The Daily Telegraph:

According to The Sunday Times:

According to The Washington Post:

According to Christine Stansell in The New Republic:

John Lanchester wrote in The New Yorker:

Selina Hastings in The Times Literary Supplement:

According to Royals historian Robert Lacey:

According to Christopher Howse in The Daily Telegraph:

Author
Tina Brown was a magazine editor for Vanity Fair and the New Yorker before authoring The Diana Chronicles. While at Vanity Fair she previously wrote about Diana's rocky marriage. In her 1985 article, The Mouse that Roared, which was the issue's cover story, she first broke the story of the breakdown in Diana's relationship with Prince Charles.

References

External links
Official Random House page
Amazon.com Product Overview
New York Times Sunday Book Review

2007 non-fiction books
Books about Diana, Princess of Wales